Souksadakone Liapvisay (born 15 January 1993, in Vientiane) is a Laotian football player. He plays for Yotha in the Lao League. He is a member of the Laos national football team.

References

External links 
 

1993 births
Living people
Laotian footballers
Laos international footballers
Yotha F.C. players
Footballers at the 2014 Asian Games

Association footballers not categorized by position
Asian Games competitors for Laos